Benjamin Franklin – also known as the Benjamin Franklin Memorial, Benjamin Franklin Statue and Cogswell Historical Monument – is an outdoor sculpture in Washington Square, San Francisco, California.

Description

The smaller-than-life-size bronze statue of American Founding Father Benjamin Franklin, by an unknown sculptor, stands upon an ornate granite base, that contains a time capsule. There are inscriptions on all four sides of the base. Spigots once dispensed drinking water into three stone basins. The spigots have been removed.

History
Created as a Temperance fountain by crusader Henry D. Cogswell, the monument was originally installed at Kearny and Market Streets in 1879. In 1904, it was relocated to Washington Square.

In 1979, 100 years after its creation, a time capsule that was hidden in the statue's base was removed and opened, and contained Cogswell's personal papers. A new time capsule, to be opened in 2079, was installed.

In popular culture
The statue is visible behind Richard Brautigan and Michaela Le Grand on the original cover of Brautigan's 1967 novel Trout Fishing in America.

See also

 Benjamin Franklin in popular culture
 Drinking fountains in the United States

References

External links

 Franklin, Benjamin statue in Washington Square in San Francisco, California at DC Memorials

1879 establishments in California
1879 sculptures
Bronze sculptures in California
Granite sculptures in California
North Beach, San Francisco
Outdoor sculptures in San Francisco
Relocated buildings and structures in California
Sculptures of men in California
Statues in San Francisco
San Francisco
Time capsules